David S. Vethamuthu (Tamil: வி. டேவிட்) (26 August 1932 – 10 July 2005) was a Malaysian unionist and former opposition politician. He won a seat in the Malaysian parliament four times, representing the constituencies of Bangsar, Dato' Kramat, Damansara and Puchong. While in parliament, he was known to be fearless and vocal in raising issues concerning the Indian community in Malaysia. He later became the chairman of the World Tamil Association in 1984. He is famously known for making Labour Day a public holiday in Malaysia.

Career

Trade unions
David was a founding member and secretary of Selangor Factories Association in 1953. He was known as 'King David' among local and international trade union circles and served as MTUC secretary-general from 1976 to 1992. He was also the Transport Workers Union secretary-general from 1958 to 1995.

David was best known for setting up the Workers Institute of Technology (WIT) in Port Klang in the early 1970s, which provided education opportunities for thousands of workers' children over the years.

At the international level, he served as the executive board member of the International Transport Federation and the International Confederation of Free Trade Union, and represented Malaysian workers at numerous International Labour Organization (ILO) conferences in Geneva, Switzerland.

Politics
David was elected as Kuala Lumpur town councillor and became the Transport Workers Union's secretary in 1958. In 1959, he was elected Bangsar Member of Parliament under the ticket of the Malayan Peoples' Socialist Front as well as the state seat of Pantai, both in Selangor. However, in 1964, he lost his seat to Devan Nair of the People's Action Party although he kept his state seat.

In 1969, David returned to parliament by winning the Dato' Kramat seat in Penang and was re-elected to his Pantai state seat for the third time, both under the newly formed Parti Gerakan Rakyat Malaysia. When Gerakan joined the Barisan Nasional in 1973, David resigned to join the Parti Keadilan Masyarakat Malaysia. In the 1974 general election, both his Dato' Kramat and Pantai seats were abolished in a re-delineation exercise. David turned to contest in the Jelutong parliament seat (also in Penang) against Rasiah Rajasingam, a former Gerakan colleague, but lost.

In 1978, as a candidate of the Democratic Action Party this time, David defeated Malaysian Indian Congress strongman, Deputy Minister S. Subramaniam for the Damansara parliament seat, but failed to retain his seat again in 1982 to Tan Koon Swan who later became Malaysian Chinese Association president. In 1986 and 1990, David was elected as Puchong Member of Parliament and, in 1995, stepped down due to health reasons.

David was arrested under the Emergency Ordinance in 1958. He was also arrested under Internal Security Act in 1964, 1969, (after the 13 May race riots) and 1987.

David became chairman of the World Tamil Association in 1984. He authored a book, Freedom that Never Came, chronicling his views on the post-independence period in Malaysia.

Death
David died in July 2005. He had served the workers for nearly 40 years from 1958 until he fell sick in 1995.

Recognition
The Malaysian Trades Union Congress (MTUC) has called on the Selangor state government to name a road after veteran trade unionist, the late V. David, in appreciation of his lifelong struggle to fight for workers' rights.

MTUC vice-president A. Balasubramaniam said there was already a precedent when Jalan 222 here was named after P. P. Narayanan, another noteworthy trade unionist. He said David deserved the honour because he served the workers for nearly 40 years from 1958 until he fell sick in 1995.

Cuepacs secretary-general Ahmad Shah Mohd Zin supported the proposal, saying union leaders should also be recognised "for their struggles and sacrifices in improving the lives of helpless workers."

Election results

References

External links
 MTUC proposes road to be named after union leader, The Star, 12 July 2009.

1932 births
2005 deaths
Malaysian trade unionists
Malaysian socialists
Malaysian politicians of Tamil descent
Malaysian politicians of Indian descent
Members of the Selangor State Legislative Assembly
Members of the Dewan Rakyat
Labour Party of Malaya politicians
Parti Gerakan Rakyat Malaysia politicians
Malaysian Social Justice Party politicians
Democratic Action Party (Malaysia) politicians